Badai-Selatan is a 1962 Indonesian horror film directed by Sofia W. D. It was entered into the 12th Berlin International Film Festival.

Cast
 W.D. Mochtar
 Sukarno M. Noor
 Ida Nursanti

References

External links

1962 films
1962 horror films
Indonesian-language films
Indonesian black-and-white films
Films directed by Sofia W. D.
Films shot in Indonesia
Indonesian horror films